This is a list of hospitals in Madagascar.  In 2019, there were 2,677 medical facilities in Madagascar, including 125 hospitals.   The other facilities are small health centers and posts.  Since most of the hospitals, dispensaries and medical centers are located in urban areas, access to medical care remains beyond the reach of many. Around 35% of the population live more than 10 km from a health facility.

Hospitals
The table below lists the hospitals in Madagascar with the name, city and region, ownership, and coordinates.  The map link below the table shows these hospitals on a map of Madagascar.

References

 Hospitals in Madagascar
Madagascar
Madagascar
Hospitals